American actress Alexis Bledel has received various awards and nominations for her work. For her role in Gilmore Girls, she received nominations for Satellite, Teen Choice and Young Artist Awards. For her role in The Handmaid's Tale she has received four Primetime Emmy Award nominations winning Outstanding Guest Actress in a Drama Series. She has also received three Screen Actors Guild Award nominations for Outstanding Ensemble Cast in a Drama Series.

Major associations

Primetime Emmy Awards

Screen Actors Guild Awards

Miscellaneous awards

ALMA Awards

Critics' Choice Movie Awards

Saturn Awards

Satellite Awards

Teen Choice Awards

Young Artist Award

Online awards

OFTA Television Award

Family Television Awards

Gold Derby Awards

References 

Bledel, Alexis